This is an overview of the 1996 Iranian legislative election in Tehran, Rey, Shemiranat and Eslamshahr electoral district.

Results

First round

Second round

Notes and references

Parliamentary elections in Tehran
1990s in Tehran
1996 elections in Iran